Blue for Two was a Swedish alternative pop / rock duo that started in Gothenburg in 1984 of Freddie Wadling (vocals) and Henryk Lipp (songwriter, synthesizers etc.).

Career

The debut album was the self-titled Blue for Two (1986). The band became very popular and one of the main bands in the Swedish alternative scene in the 1980s. For their live performances, they were often accompanied by Sator guitarist Chips Kiesbye. The band was most active in the 1980s and the 1990s.

Blue for Two made a comeback with the album Tune the Piano, Hand Me a Razor in 2012 reaching No. 18 in the Swedish Albums Chart.

Discography

Albums

References

External links
MySpace
Discogs.com

Swedish alternative rock groups